Oberea shirakii is a species of beetle in the family Cerambycidae. It was described by Masao Hayashi in 1963.

References

Beetles described in 1963
shirakii